Dallas Abbott is a research scientist at the Lamont–Doherty Earth Observatory of Columbia University and is part of the Holocene Impact Working Group. The primary focus of her present research is on submarine impact craters and their contribution to climate change and megatsunamis. She also has presented research regarding a large impact crater in the Gulf of Maine.

Abbott received her B.S. from the Massachusetts Institute of Technology (Earth and Planetary Sciences) in 1974; her M.S. from the Lamont–Doherty Earth Observatory of Columbia University (Marine Geology) in 1978; and her Ph.D. from the Lamont–Doherty Earth Observatory (Marine Geology with a Geophysics minor) in 1982.

Selected publications
 Geophysical Theory. Columbia University Press (1990) 
 Heat flow results from the Gorda Ridge. Oregon Department of Geology and Mineral Industries Open-file Report (1986)

See also
Chevron (land form)

References

American geophysicists
Columbia University alumni
Massachusetts Institute of Technology School of Science alumni
Living people
Year of birth missing (living people)
Marine geophysicists